Campo Sant'Angelo, also known as Campo Sant'Anzolo, is a city square in the sestiere of San Marco, in the city of Venice, Italy.

The piazza is asymmetric, and bounded on the South-West by the Rio di San Anzolo, across which stands the former monastery of Santo Stefano. 

In the piazza is a small building, the 10th-century Oratorio di Sant'Angelo degli Zoppi, once allied to a school for the crippled. The bounds of the piazza include the Palazzo Trevisan Pisani, the Palazzo Gritti Morosini, and the Palazzo Duodo a Sant'Angelo. In this latter palace, the composer Domenico Cimarosa died while in exile from the Kingdom of Naples.

Piazzas and campos in Venice